Nesozineus ateuchus is a species of beetle in the family Cerambycidae. It was described by Galileo and Martins in 1996.

References

Acanthoderini
Beetles described in 1996